Donald Boyd Easum (August 27, 1923 – April 16, 2016) was an American diplomat.

Foreign service
Easum spent 27 years in the United States Foreign Service at posts in Nicaragua, Indonesia, Senegal, the Gambia, Guinea-Bissau, Niger, Upper Volta (Ambassador, 1971–74) and Nigeria (Ambassador, 1975–79). 
During the Nixon/Ford Administration, Easum served as Assistant Secretary of State for African Affairs. Earlier State Department assignments included Executive Secretary of the United States Agency for International Development (USAID) and Staff Director of the United States National Security Council's Interdepartmental Group for Latin America. Easum was also president of the Africa-America Institute from 1980 to 1988.

In 2004, Easum was among 27 retired diplomats and military commanders called who publicly said the administration of President George W. Bush did not understand the world and was unable to handle "in either style or substance" the responsibilities of global leadership. On June 16, 2004 the Diplomats and Military Commanders for Change issued a statement against the Iraq War.

Background and education
Easum was born in Culver, Union Township, Marshall County, Indiana, the son of Chester Verne Easum and Norma Moore Brown.  He grew up in Madison, Wisconsin because his father taught at the University of Wisconsin. During World War II, Easum served in the United States Army Air Forces in the Pacific. Easum was Senior Fellow at Yale University's Stimson Seminar from 1998 to 2004 and taught at Princeton University’s Woodrow Wilson School of Public and International Affairs. He lectured widely in the United States, Europe and Africa on U.S.-African relations. Easum attended The Hotchkiss School, and held a B.A. degree (Phi Beta Kappa) from the University of Wisconsin–Madison. Easum also received his M.P.A. degree, in 1950, and his Ph.D. degree, in 1953, from Princeton University. He also studied at the University of London on a Fulbright scholarship and in Buenos Aires on a Doherty Foundation grant and a Penfield fellowship. He was a member of the American Academy of Diplomacy and Council on Foreign Relations. Easum lived in New York City.

Writings
 La Prensa and the Freedom of the Press in Argentina, 1951
 "United States Policy Toward South Africa," Chapter 12 in Race and Politics in South Africa, edited by Ian Robertson and Philip Whitten, Transaction, Inc., New Brunswick, NJ, 1978
 The call for black studies, (U.S. Foreign Service Institute. Senior Seminar in Foreign Policy. Case study)

References

External links
Donald B. Easum's obituary

1923 births
2016 deaths
People from Marshall County, Indiana
People from Madison, Wisconsin
Military personnel from Indiana
United States Army Air Forces personnel of World War II
Assistant Secretaries of State for African Affairs
Hotchkiss School alumni
Princeton School of Public and International Affairs alumni
University of Wisconsin–Madison alumni
Alumni of the University of London
Writers from Indiana
Ambassadors of the United States to Burkina Faso
Ambassadors of the United States to Nigeria
United States Foreign Service personnel
American expatriates in Nicaragua
American expatriates in Indonesia
American expatriates in Senegal
American expatriates in the Gambia
American expatriates in Guinea-Bissau
American expatriates in Niger